Gilbert Roy Taylor (9 July 1900 – 1 April 1980) was an Australian rules footballer who played for Fitzroy and coached Geelong in the Victorian Football League (VFL).

Originally from Warragul, Taylor spent four seasons at Fitzroy where he played as a defender. His last league game was the 1922 Grand Final win, in which he starred from the back pocket. A policeman, he had been transferred to Geelong in 1922 but having failed to gain a clearance from Fitzroy he left the club after the Grand Final. The following season he joined Geelong as non playing coach and steered the club to the finals.

In 1924 he went to Western Australia and played for West Perth for two years, winning selection for Western Australia in their 1924 Hobart Carnival team. He returned to Victoria in 1926 as playing coach for the Geelong Association side in the Victorian Football Association. In 1928 he became player-coach of Preston.

References

External links

Bert Taylor's coaching statistics from AFL Tables
Bert Taylor's VFA statistics from the VFA Project

1900 births
1980 deaths
Australian rules footballers from Victoria (Australia)
Warragul Football Club players
Fitzroy Football Club players
Fitzroy Football Club Premiership players
Geelong Football Club coaches
West Perth Football Club players
Preston Football Club (VFA) players
One-time VFL/AFL Premiership players